Tremon Smith (born July 20, 1996) is an American football cornerback and kick returner for the Denver Broncos of the National Football League (NFL). He played college football at Central Arkansas, and was drafted by the Kansas City Chiefs in the sixth round of the 2018 NFL Draft.

Early years
Smith attended Saks High School in Saks, Alabama, where he played high school football. 
Smith led the team to the AHSAA Class 4A semi-finals at quarterback, safety, kick returner, punt returner, in 2013

College career
Smith played college football at Central Arkansas. In 2017, Smith had 41 tackles and five interceptions, earning him a selection as a third-team FCS All-American. In his four years at Central Arkansas, Smith had 15 interceptions.

Professional career

Kansas City Chiefs
Smith was drafted by the Kansas City Chiefs in the sixth round (196th overall) of the 2018 NFL Draft. He primarily played on special teams (particularly as a kick returner) during his rookie season, but also saw some playing time on defense as a cornerback. During the 2018 season, he had 33 returns for 886 yards, averaging 26.8 yards per return. He was named to the NFL All-Rookie Team as a returner.

Prior to the 2019 season, the Chiefs moved Smith from cornerback to running back; after the preseason, however, he was moved back to cornerback.

Smith was waived by the Chiefs on September 14, 2019.

Green Bay Packers
Smith was claimed off waivers by the Green Bay Packers on September 17, 2019. He was waived on October 14 and re-signed to the practice squad two days later. He was promoted to the active roster on October 29. On December 2, 2019, Smith was waived by the Packers.

Philadelphia Eagles
On December 4, 2019, Smith was signed to the Philadelphia Eagles practice squad. He signed a reserve/future contract with the Eagles on January 6, 2020. He was waived on July 26, 2020.

Indianapolis Colts
On August 16, 2020, Smith signed with the Indianapolis Colts. He was waived on September 5, 2020, and re-signed to the team's practice squad the next day. He was promoted to the active roster on September 22, 2020.

Houston Texans
Smith signed with the Houston Texans on March 22, 2021. During a stellar season as a core special teamer, Smith signed a one-year contract extension on December 3, 2021. In Week 15, Smith had a 98-yard kick return touchdown and downed a punt inside the five-yard line in a 30-16 win over the Jacksonville Jaguars, earning AFC Special Teams Player of the Week. On December 11th, 2022, in a game against the Dallas Cowboys, Smith intercepted the Cowboys' Quarterback Dak Prescott twice marking the first and second of his career.

Denver Broncos
On March 17, 2023, the Denver Broncos signed Smith to a two-year contract.

NFL career statistics

Regular season

Postseason

References

External links
Kansas City Chiefs bio
 Central Arkansas Bears bio

1996 births
Living people
American football cornerbacks
American football running backs
Central Arkansas Bears football players
Denver Broncos players
Green Bay Packers players
Houston Texans players
Indianapolis Colts players
Kansas City Chiefs players
Philadelphia Eagles players
Players of American football from Alabama
Sportspeople from Anniston, Alabama